The Thor T/A is a Canadian ultralight aircraft that was designed by Thorsten B. Strenger (or possibly Gunter Webster) and produced by Thor Air of Weston, Ontario. The aircraft was supplied as a kit for amateur construction.

Design and development
It features a strut-braced high-wing, a single-seat, open cockpit, conventional landing gear and a single engine in tractor configuration.

The aircraft is made from bolted-together aluminum tubing, with its flying surfaces covered in Dacron sailcloth. Its 80% double-surface  span wing is braced with "V" lift struts. The pilot is accommodated on an open seat, protected by a simple windshield. The landing gear has suspension on the main wheels and features a steerable tailwheel. The three axis control system is unusual. Pitch and roll are conventionally controlled with elevator and rudder, while roll is controlled with tip rudders.

Variants
T/A
Initial design, powered by a  Rotax 277 single cylinder, two-stroke powerplant.
1-A
Up-engined model, powered by a  Rotax 447 twin cylinder, two-stroke powerplant.

Two-seater
Similar to the single-seat models but with a second seat for dual instruction.

Specifications (T/A)

References

1980s Canadian ultralight aircraft
Homebuilt aircraft
Single-engined tractor aircraft